Chui Lai Kwan (born June 3, 1990) is a former competitive swimmer on the national Malaysian swim team.

She left the Malaysian national team in 2011 after a dispute with the Amateur Swimming Union of Malaysia (ASUM), after the 2011 Summer Universiade in Shenzhen.

Swimming career 

At the 2014 Commonwealth Games in Glasgow, Scotland, Kwan ranked fifteenth in the 50-meter freestyle with a time of 26:00. She also placed seventeenth in the 50-meter freestyle (57:60).

References 

1990 births
Living people
Malaysian female freestyle swimmers
Swimmers at the 2014 Commonwealth Games
Commonwealth Games competitors for Malaysia
People from Sabah
21st-century Malaysian women
Swimmers at the 2006 Asian Games
Swimmers at the 2010 Asian Games